The Honda RC213V is a Japanese motorcycle developed for road racing by Honda Racing Corporation to compete in the MotoGP series from the 2012 season and onwards.

The model name designates the following:
RC= Honda's traditional racing prefix for 4-stroke bikes
213= third works bike of the 21st century
V= V engine

A limited-production run of a hand-built, road-going version designated RC213V-S was introduced in 2015 as a MotoGP replica. Honda merchandised a Sports Kit upgrade package to allow owners to improve the specification for non-road use.

History
Compared to the RC212V, the most significant new design features of the RC213V were its 1000cc displacement and 90° cylinder angle. 

The widening of the angle from 75.5° to 90° made it possible to increase the displacement to 1000cc without raising the center of gravity and gave the engine better primary balance. Because a balance shaft was no longer necessary, weight was saved.

Advances in electronics now made it possible to control handling without a reverse-rotating crank. Because the new forward-rotating crank didn't need an idle gear, even more weight was saved.

The 90° angle gave Honda more options to experiment with firing order, and in 2012 Honda wanted a firing order that would maximize horsepower. The RC213V's original firing order was described as “screamer mode," which it may have been, compared to its predecessors, but the actual specifications weren't revealed.  Possibly they were the 180°-270°-180°-90° near-screamer intervals of Honda's V4, 180°-crank, VFR, or the 90°-270°-90°-270° "droner" intervals of Honda's 360°-crank superbike racers, the RC30 and RC45.

For the 2012 season, Honda fielded two factory RC213Vs, ridden by Repsol Honda teammates Casey Stoner and Dani Pedrosa; a third and fourth were used by Álvaro Bautista on the Gresini Racing team, and Stefan Bradl on the LCR team. Jonathan Rea also competed in two Grands Prix as a replacement rider for Casey Stoner, following his crash at Indianapolis. At the first pre-season test in late 2011, Pedrosa and Stoner were at the top of the timesheets.
 From their combined efforts, with the Repsol riders winning 12 races of 18, and finishing 2nd and 3rd in the riders championship, the RC213V won its maiden constructors championship under the first year of 1000 cc regulations.

In 2013, the reigning Moto2 champion Marc Márquez replaced retired Casey Stoner on the Repsol Honda team, and won the riders championship on the RC213V.  Dani Pedrosa came third in the riders' championship, and the RC213V won its second constructors' championship in its second year on track.

In 2014, at the first pre-season test at Sepang, the RC213V continued to top the time sheets, with its riders coming in 1st, 3rd, 5th, and 6th on the first day of the Sepang Test, and 1st, 2nd, 3rd and 9th on the second day.

After Yamaha won the constructors' championship in 2015, and the rules began to prohibit sophisticated electronics in 2016, Honda went back to a heavier, reverse-rotating crankshaft as the best way to improve handling, By 2019 all the constructors would reach the same conclusion. Honda also went back to a "big bang" firing order, something they knew a lot about. It was Honda who discovered in 1992 that a firing order with even intervals was not conducive to good traction. In 2017, specifications for the RC213V indicated a 180° crankshaft and “four simultaneous power strokes,” implying that the new firing intervals might have been 90°-90°-90°-450°, but the exact specifications were not revealed.

For the 2019 Grand Prix Season, three specifications of the RC213V were tested by Marquez and the newly signed rider, Jorge Lorenzo. The tests were conducted over two days at the Circuit Ricardo Tormo near Valencia, Spain. On the first day, the times were recorded as 1:31.718 for Marquez and 1:32.959 for Lorenzo. On the second day. they were 1:30.911 and 1:31.584, respectively. The chosen specifications were not revealed, but they must have been good ones, as Marquez and Honda won the 2019 riders' and constructors' championships.

Whatever Honda's changes were in the following three years, they were not for the better. After Honda won the constructors' championship in 2012, 2013, 2014, 2016, 2017, 2018, and 2019 with the RC213V, Ducati won in 2020, 2021, and 2022 with the Desmosedici. In those three years Honda could manage only 5th, 4th, and 6th in the constructors' standings.   

When asked about the changes for 2022, project manager Takeo Yokoyama explained, “In the past two years, we had problems with the grip on the rear wheel...We decided to start from scratch with the engine. We built the new bike around the new engine." Yokoyama didn't reveal any details, but it appears the engine was tilted backwards. According to one report, everything but the V4 configuration and the firing order was changed. Nevertheless, Ducati continued to dominate, and Honda fell even farther behind. Marquez had several crashes and was sidelined for much of the season, though the crashes were not necessarily the fault of the RC213V. However, Honda's Pol Espargaro claimed that the 2022 variant had "no strong points," and test-rider Stefan Bradl claimed it had "unacceptable" heat problems.

Production racers

RCV1000R
The RCV1000R lacks the seamless shift gearbox and the pneumatic operated valves of the RC213V and uses the official Dorna-issued ECU software.

RC213V-RS

For  the new RC213V-RS replaced the RCV1000R, adopting the pneumatic operated valves but still lacking the seamless shift gearbox.

Specifications

RC213V-S

On 11 June 2015, Honda released the limited-run RC213V-S. The motorcycle is a street-legal MotoGP replica. Honda claims the motorcycle shares 80% of its parts with the MotoGP version. Differences include steel springs instead of pneumatic springs, stainless steel brakes instead of carbon brakes, 6-speed sequential manual instead of seamless shift, 17" Marchesini wheels instead of 16.5", and a larger steering angle. European models rev to 12,000rpm with an optional power kit increasing it to 14,000. US models are limited to 9,400rpm due to sound noise laws. The power kit is not available for US models.

Complete MotoGP results

Motorcycle summary
These results are accurate up to the 2022 Dutch TT.

World Championship titles:
Constructors: 7

Races won: 83
2012: Pedrosa 7, Stoner 5 (12 in total)
2013: Márquez 6, Pedrosa 3 (9 in total)
2014: Márquez 13, Pedrosa 1 (14 in total)
2015: Márquez 5, Pedrosa 2 (7 in total)
2016: Márquez 5, Pedrosa 1, Crutchlow 2, Miller 1 (8 in total)
2017: Márquez 6, Pedrosa 2 (8 in total)
2018: Márquez 9, Crutchlow 1 (10 in total)
2019: Márquez 12 (12 in total)
2021: Márquez 3 (3 in total)

Poles: 84
2012: Pedrosa 5, Stoner 5, Bautista 1 (11 in total)
2013: Márquez 9, Pedrosa 2, Bradl 1 (12 in total)
2014: Márquez 13, Pedrosa 1 (14 in total)
2015: Márquez 8, Pedrosa 1 (9 in total)
2016: Márquez 6, Crutchlow 1 (7 in total)
2017: Márquez 8, Pedrosa 3 (11 in total)
2018: Márquez 7, Crutchlow 1 (8 in total)
2019: Márquez 10 (10 in total)
2020: Nakagami 1 (1 in total)
2021: Espargaró 1 (1 in total)

RC213V results
(key) (results in bold indicate pole position; results in italics indicate fastest lap)

*Season still in progress.

RCV1000R results

(key)

RC213V-RS results
(key)

See also 
 KTM RC16
 Aprilia RS-GP
 Suzuki GSX-RR
 Yamaha YZR-M1
 Ducati Desmosedici

Notes

References

External links
 Honda MotoGP official site

RC212V
Grand Prix motorcycles
Motorcycles introduced in 2012